Darjeeling Municipality is responsible for the civic administration of the town of Darjeeling, West Bengal, India. Established in 1850, it is one of the oldest municipalities in West Bengal and one of the oldest city administrative bodies in India.

Structure
The municipality refers to the board of Councillors, with one Councillor being elected from each of the 32 wards of Darjeeling town and also some non-elected members who are nominated by the state government. The Board of Councillors elects a chairman from among its elected members.

According to the West Bengal Municipal Act, 1993, Darjeeling municipality is run by the Chairman-in-Council system of governance, and consists of the chairman, the Vice Chairman and seven other members of the board of Councillors. The Chairman is the executive head of the municipality and the municipal administration is under his control. The Chairman nominates the Chairman-in-Council and distributes the various functions of the municipality. The Chairman presides over the meetings of the Chairman-in-Council as well as the board of Councillors, and in his absence the Vice Chairman chairs the meetings. The administrative functions of the municipalities are dealt through the committees and are headed by the Chairman-in-Council.

References
Khawas, Vimal. 2003. Urban Management in Darjeeling Himalaya: A Case Study of Darjeeling Municipality. The Mountain Forum.

Gorkhaland
Darjeeling
Municipalities of West Bengal